Erminio Favalli (29 January 1944 – 18 April 2008) was an Italian football player and managing director, who played as a midfielder. He spent most of his playing career with Juventus and Palermo, and joined Cremonese as part of the managing staff after his retirement from active football.

Career

Playing career

Favalli was born 1944 in Cremona, and started his playing career with hometown club Cremonese, then in Serie C. He later joined Internazionale, then moving to Foggia the following year. From 1966 to 1970 he played for Juventus. He then moved to Mantova before to join Palermo, where he spent seven seasons as a rosanero mainstay. He retired in 1977.

Favalli won a total of two Serie A championships: with Internazionale in 1964–65, and with Juventus in 1966–67.

Post-playing career

In 1982, he started a career as director of football with Cremonese, his first professional team as a player. He then filled the same position for Palermo in the 1980s before to return to Cremonese, where he oversaw the club successes in the 1990s, including an Anglo-Italian Cup won in 1993. From 2002 to 2007 he worked with Pizzighettone, being part of the club management that led the minor Lombardian side from Serie D to Serie C1. He returned to Cremonese for the 2007–08 season, this time as Emiliano Mondonico's assistant coach.

Death

Favalli suddenly died on 18 April 2008, aged 64, because of a fatal heart attack.

References

Italian footballers
1944 births
2008 deaths
Sportspeople from Cremona
Serie A players
Serie B players
U.S. Cremonese players
Inter Milan players
Calcio Foggia 1920 players
Juventus F.C. players
Mantova 1911 players
Palermo F.C. players
Association football midfielders
Footballers from Lombardy